Redfield & West Streets Historic District is a state-designated historic district in New Haven, Connecticut. It is located in The Hill neighborhood in southern New Haven.

It consists of a single city block, bordered on the south by Columbus Ave (US Route 1), on the northeast by Redfield St, on the north by Congress Ave, and on the southwest by West St. Both sides of West and Redfield Streets in the block are within the district, but only the south side of Congress Ave and the north side of Columbus Ave.

See also
Fairlawn-Nettleton Historic District and Elm Street Historic District, other state historic districts in New Haven that are not listed on the National Register of Historic Places

References

Historic districts in New Haven, Connecticut